Laiq Muhammad Khan is a Pakistani politician who had been a member of the National Assembly of Pakistan from 2010 to 2013. He was also a member of the Provincial Assembly of Khyber Pakhtunkhwa from August 2018 to January 2023.

Political career

He was elected to the National Assembly of Pakistan from Constituency NA-21 (Mansehra-II) as a candidate of Jamiat Ulema-e Islam (F) (JUI-F) in by-polls held in January 2010. He received 36,622 votes and defeated Zur Gul Khan, a candidate of Pakistan Muslim League (Q) (PML-Q).

He ran for the seat of the National Assembly from Constituency NA-21 (Mansehra-cum-Tor Ghar) as a candidate of JUI-F in 2013 Pakistani general election but was unsuccessful. He received 43,342 votes and lost the seat to Muhammad Safdar Awan.

In 2015, he left JUI-F and joined Pakistan Muslim League (N) (PML-N).

He was elected to the Provincial Assembly of Khyber Pakhtunkhwa as a candidate of Awami National Party (ANP) from Constituency PK-35 (Torghar) in 2018 Pakistani general election. Following his successful election, he was named by the opposition parties as its joint candidate for the office of Speaker of Khyber Pakhtunkhwa Assembly. He received 27 
votes and lost the seat to Pakistan Tehreek-e-Insaf (PTI) candidate Mushtaq Ahmed Ghani who secured 81 votes.

References

Awami National Party MPAs (Khyber Pakhtunkhwa)
Living people
People from Mansehra District
Swati
Pakistani MNAs 2008–2013
Year of birth missing (living people)